Kalmar County is one of the 29 multi-member constituencies of the Riksdag, the national legislature of Sweden. The constituency was established in 1970 when the Riksdag changed from a bicameral legislature to a unicameral legislature. It is conterminous with the county of Kalmar. The constituency currently elects eight of the 349 members of the Riksdag using the open party-list proportional representation electoral system. At the 2022 general election it had 189,781 registered electors.

Electoral system
Kalmar County currently elects eight of the 349 members of the Riksdag using the open party-list proportional representation electoral system. Constituency seats are allocated using the modified Sainte-Laguë method. Only parties that that reach the 4% national threshold and parties that receive at least 12% of the vote in the constituency compete for constituency seats. Supplementary leveling seats may also be allocated at the constituency level to parties that reach the 4% national threshold.

Election results

Summary

(Excludes leveling seats)

Detailed

2020s

2022
Results of the 2022 general election held on 11 September 2022:

The following candidates were elected:
 Constituency seats - Mattias Bäckström Johansson (SD), 304 votes; Gudrun Brunegård (KD), 271 votes; Lars Engsund (M), 596 votes; Lena Hallengren (S), 5,836 votes; Tomas Kronståhl (S), 557 votes; Laila Naraghi (S), 850 votes; Marie Nicholson (M), 903 votes; and Mona Olin (SD), 0 votes.

2010s

2018
Results of the 2018 general election held on 9 September 2018:

The following candidates were elected:
 Constituency seats - Anders Åkesson (C), 1,323 votes; Jan R. Andersson (M), 1,293 votes; Mattias Bäckström Johansson (SD), 314 votes; Lena Hallengren (S), 3,584 votes; Tomas Kronståhl (S), 1,179 votes; Jimmy Loord (KD), 444 ,votes; Laila Naraghi (S), 1,951 votes; and Anne Oskarsson (SD), 92 votes.

2014
Results of the 2014 general election held on 14 September 2014:

The following candidates were elected:
 Constituency seats - Anders Åkesson (C), 1,714 votes; Jan R. Andersson (M), 1,304 votes; Jörgen Andersson (M), 1,077 votes; Paula Bieler (SD), 23 votes; Lena Hallengren (S), 3,824 votes; Håkan Juholt (S), 5,240 votes; Krister Örnfjäder (S), 1,120 votes; and Christina Thuring (SD).

2010
Results of the 2010 general election held on 19 September 2010:

The following candidates were elected:
 Constituency seats - Anders Åkesson (C), 1,562 votes; Jan R. Andersson (M), 2,254 votes; Jörgen Andersson (M), 459 votes; Eva Bengtson Skogsberg (M), 1,066 votes; Lena Hallengren (S), 2,574 votes; Håkan Juholt (S), 5,220 votes; Désirée Liljevall (S), 710 votes; and Krister Örnfjäder (S), 1,438 votes.
 Leveling seats - Anders Andersson (KD), 1,241 votes.

2000s

2006
Results of the 2006 general election held on 17 September 2006:

The following candidates were elected:
 Constituency seats - Anders Åkesson (C), 1,716 votes; Jan R. Andersson (M), 1,241 votes; Eva Bengtson Skogsberg (M), 600 votes; Lena Hallengren (S), 2,027 votes; Håkan Juholt (S), 4,835 votes; Désirée Liljevall (S), 763 votes; and Krister Örnfjäder (S), 1,537 votes; and Chatrine Pålsson Ahlgren (KD), 1,276 votes.

2002
Results of the 2002 general election held on 15 September 2002:

The following candidates were elected:
 Constituency seats - Nils Fredrik Aurelius (M), 1,536 votes; Ann-Marie Fagerström (S), 2,173 votes; Agne Hansson (C), 2,397 votes; Håkan Juholt (S), 5,376 votes; Krister Örnfjäder (S), 2,206 votes; Chatrine Pålsson (KD), 884 votes; Agneta Ringman (S), 969 votes; and Sverker Thorén (FP), 1,011 votes.
 Leveling seats - Lennart Beijer (V), 1,296 votes.

1990s

1998
Results of the 1998 general election held on 20 September 1998:

The following candidates were elected:
 Constituency seats - Nils Fredrik Aurelius (M), 2,168 votes; Lennart Beijer (V), 1,220 votes; Leif Carlson (M), 934 votes; Ann-Marie Fagerström (S), 1,053 votes; Agne Hansson (C), 2,271 votes; Håkan Juholt (S), 3,591 votes; Krister Örnfjäder (S), 1,566 votes; Chatrine Pålsson (KD), 1,133 votes; and Agneta Ringman (S), 1,231 votes.

1994
Results of the 1994 general election held on 18 September 1994:

1991
Results of the 1991 general election held on 15 September 1991:

1980s

1988
Results of the 1988 general election held on 18 September 1988:

1985
Results of the 1985 general election held on 15 September 1985:

1982
Results of the 1982 general election held on 19 September 1982:

1970s

1979
Results of the 1979 general election held on 16 September 1979:

1976
Results of the 1976 general election held on 19 September 1976:

1973
Results of the 1973 general election held on 16 September 1973:

1970
Results of the 1970 general election held on 20 September 1970:

References

Riksdag constituency
Riksdag constituencies
Riksdag constituencies established in 1970